Stephen Broad (born 10 June 1980) is an English footballer, who played as a defender in the Football League for Southend United. He has also played for non-League clubs, Hayes, Kingstonian, Corinthian-Casuals and Sutton United.

Football career
As a youth, Broad played for Chelsea for five years rising through the youth ranks before captaining Chelsea's reserve side, which included John Terry. He joined Conference National side, Hayes on loan in 1999. He then joined Southend United on loan in 2001.

He made his debut for Southend United in Third Division, in the 1–1 away draw against Chesterfield on 31 March 2001. He joined Kingstonian in June 2003 alongside Mark Beard.

Broad rejoined Kingstonian in October 2006, after making a few appearances at Corinthian-Casuals and Sutton United during the 2006–07 season.

After football
Broad decided to give up full-time football in 2003, and after working as a taxi driver in Essex now works supporting children with autism. In 2016, he appeared as a contestant on Countdown.
Also appeared as a contestant on Ken Bruce's BBC Radio 2 program Pop Master in 2022

References

External links

1980 births
Living people
Footballers from Sutton, London
English footballers
Chelsea F.C. players
Hayes F.C. players
Southend United F.C. players
Kingstonian F.C. players
Corinthian-Casuals F.C. players
Sutton United F.C. players
English Football League players
National League (English football) players
Association football defenders
British taxi drivers